Thomas Francis Birmingham (August 4, 1949 – January 20, 2023) was an American politician who served as the President of the Massachusetts Senate. He is widely credited, along with Mark Roosevelt, with passage of a sweeping education bill, the Education Reform Act of 1993. 

He was a graduate of Austin Preparatory School, Phillips Exeter Academy, Harvard College, and Harvard Law School, and he received a Rhodes Scholarship to study at Oxford University after his 1972 graduation from Harvard College. He was an unsuccessful candidate for the Democratic nomination for Massachusetts governor in 2002, despite impressive fundraising. An avid cyclist, Birmingham biked across the state of Massachusetts in 2001.

In 1999, his proposal to keep the home stadium of the New England Patriots in Massachusetts was accepted by Patriots owner Robert Kraft and passed by the state legislature.

Birmingham served as senior counsel at the law firm of Edwards Wildman Palmer, taught state and local government at Tufts University and education policy at Northeastern University in Boston. In March 2014, he joined Citizen Schools Massachusetts as executive director. In early 2015, he left  Citizen Schools Massachusetts to become a distinguished senior fellow in education at Pioneer Institute. His is listed as a notable holder of the Birmingham coat of arms. His wife, Selma Botman, has a Ph.D. in Middle Eastern Studies from Harvard University and served as the President of the University of Southern Maine. They have two daughters, Erica and Megan.

Birmingham died on January 20, 2023, at the age of 73.

See also
 1991–1992 Massachusetts legislature
 1993–1994 Massachusetts legislature
 1995–1996 Massachusetts legislature
 1997–1998 Massachusetts legislature
 1999–2000 Massachusetts legislature
 2001–2002 Massachusetts legislature

References

External links
 Distinguished Senior Fellow in Education at Pioneer Institute

1949 births
2023 deaths
American Rhodes Scholars
Harvard Law School alumni
Massachusetts state senators
Presidents of the Massachusetts Senate
Politicians from Chelsea, Massachusetts
Harvard College alumni
Lawyers from Chelsea, Massachusetts
Phillips Exeter Academy alumni